Alan I. Marcus (born August 15, 1949) is the author of the history textbook Building Western Civilization: From the Advent of Writing to the Age of Steam (1998)  He is also the author of works focusing on the History of Technology, Science, Medicine, Intellectual History, and the History of Agriculture. His most recent work Malignant Growth: Creating the Modern Cancer Research Establishment, 1875-1915 was published in 2018 by the University of Alabama Press. He was a professor of history at Iowa State University from 1980 to 2005. He started his position as the head of the history department at Mississippi State University in 2005 and is currently in said position. He has received numerous awards and honors throughout his academic career.

References 

20th-century American historians
American male non-fiction writers
Iowa State University faculty
Mississippi State University faculty
1949 births
Living people
20th-century American male writers